Up'n Down is a video game developed and published by Sega. It was first released in 1983 as an arcade game, then later ported to the Atari 2600, ColecoVision, Atari 8-bit family, and Commodore 64. In Up'n Down the player drives a car forward and backward along a branching, vertically scrolling track, collecting flags and jumping on other cars to destroy them.

Gameplay 

Up'n Down is a vertically scrolling game that employs a pseudo-3D perspective. The player controls a purple dune buggy that resembles a Volkswagen Beetle. The buggy moves forward along a single-lane path; pressing up or down on the joystick causes the buggy to speed up or slow down, pressing right or left causes the buggy to switch lanes at an intersection, and pressing the "jump" button causes the buggy to jump in the air. Jumping is required to avoid other cars on the road; the player can either jump all the way over them, or land on them for points.

To complete a round, the player must collect 10 colored flags by running over them with the buggy. If the player passes by a flag without picking it up, it will appear again later in the round. The roads feature inclines and descents that affect the buggy's speed, and bridges that must be jumped. A player loses a turn whenever the buggy either collides with another vehicle without jumping on it, or jumps off the road and into the grass or water.

Atari 2600 port 

Sega released a port for the Atari 2600 in 1984 with jarring background music. According to Game Sound: An Introduction to the History, Theory, and Practice of Video Game Music and Sound Design by Karen Collins, the arcade version's "bluesy F-sharp minor groove" was transformed into "a very unsettling version based in C minor with a flattened melodic sound" because of limitations of the 2600 sound hardware.

Reception 
In Japan, Game Machine listed Up'n Down on their November 1, 1983 issue as being the second most-successful new table arcade unit of the month.

See also 
Bump 'n' Jump

References

External links 

 

1983 video games
Sega video games
Sega System 1 games
Sega arcade games
Atari 2600 games
Atari 8-bit family games
ColecoVision games
Commodore 64 games
Cancelled ZX Spectrum games
Racing video games
U.S. Gold games
Video games developed in Japan